Four Friends is a 1981 American comedy-drama film directed by Arthur Penn. The semi-autobiographical screenplay by Steve Tesich follows the path of the title characters from high school to college during the often turbulent 1960s and beyond. The cast features Craig Wasson, Jodi Thelen, Jim Metzler and Glenne Headly.

Plot synopsis
The titular quartet are Yugoslavian-born Danilo Prozor, who arrived in America at the age of twelve and ever since has been trying to distinguish between the reality of his adopted homeland and the idealistic vision of it he brought with him; overweight, Jewish mama's boy David; Tom, the attractive WASP jock who has a way with the ladies; and free-spirited, self-assured Georgia, who fancies herself the reincarnation of Isadora Duncan, dreams of a successful career as a dancer, and is loved in turn by each of her three friends.

The film is a series of vignettes whose primary focus is on Danilo: his conflicts with his father, his struggles with his heritage, his courtship and thwarted marriage to Long Island debutante Adrienne Carnahan (who is murdered by her own father in a murder-suicide at the wedding reception because of his refusal to accept the marriage) and his lingering relationship with Georgia.

Cast
Craig Wasson as Danilo Prozor
Jodi Thelen as Georgia Miles
Michael Huddleston as David 
Jim Metzler as Tom
Miklos Simon as Mr. Prozor 
Elizabeth Lawrence as Mrs. Prozor
Julia Murray as Adrienne Carnahan
Reed Birney as Louie
James Leo Herlihy as Mr. Carnahan
Lois Smith as Mrs. Carnahan 
Glenne Headly as  Lola

Production notes
The film was shot on location in East Chicago, Hammond, and Whiting in Indiana; Chicago and Elgin in Illinois; Philadelphia; and on the campus of Northwestern University.

The soundtrack includes "Georgia on My Mind" by Hoagy Carmichael and Stuart Gorrell, performed by Ray Charles; the theme song from Bonanza by Jay Livingston and Ray Evans; "Hit the, Road Jack" by Percy Mayfield; "Shop Around" by Berry Gordy and Smokey Robinson; "Blue Moon" by Richard Rodgers and Lorenz Hart, performed by The Marcels; and "The Third Man Theme" by Anton Karas, performed by Guy Lombardo & His Royal Canadians. The music editor was Suzana Peric

However, the main musical theme of the film, a melody from Antonín Dvořák's New World Symphony, is not credited.

Reception
In his review in The New York Times, Vincent Canby called it "the best film yet made about the sixties" and added, "It has the quality of legend, a fable remembered . . . [It] is one of Mr. Penn's most deeply felt achievements, ranking alongside Bonnie and Clyde, Alice's Restaurant, and Little Big Man. For Mr. Tesich, it is another original work by one of our best young screenwriters."

Roger Ebert of the Chicago Sun-Times described it as "a very good movie" and commented, "The wonder is not that Four Friends covers so much ground, but that it makes many of its scenes so memorable that we learn more even about the supporting characters than we expect to."

TV Guide rates the film three out of a possible four stars, saying it "attempts to cover so much ground that at times the film becomes frustratingly muddled", and adding, "Though [it] runs out of gas toward the end, it's filmed with obvious love for the characters and features outstanding performances from the underrated Wasson, Thelen and Simon. Well worth seeing."

Time Out New York says, "Although its episodic narrative entails a certain lack of unity, it's nevertheless an ambitious and impressive work . . . A dense but never pretentious film that manages to convey the atmosphere of the '50s and '60s succinctly, it offers delights galore, not least a light, perceptive wit and an unsentimental ability to touch the emotions."

Channel 4 calls it a "stodgy, sentimental brew" and "a well-meaning film that doesn't really amount to much in the long run."

The film was a commercial failure and Penn did not make another film for four years.

DVD
Four Friends was brought to DVD by MGM Home Video on August 23, 2005 in widescreen and Dolby stereo.

References

External links
 
 

1981 films
1980s coming-of-age comedy-drama films
American coming-of-age comedy-drama films
1980s English-language films
Films directed by Arthur Penn
Films set in Illinois
Films set in Indiana
Films set in the 1960s
Films shot in Illinois
Films shot in Indiana
Filmways films
1980s American films